Daubach is an Ortsgemeinde – a community belonging to a Verbandsgemeinde – in the Westerwaldkreis in Rhineland-Palatinate, Germany. It belongs to the Verbandsgemeinde of Montabaur, a kind of collective municipality.

Geography

The community lies west of Bundesautobahn 3, five kilometres from Montabaur, to the lee of the Stelzenbach Forest, above the Gelbach Valley and only seven kilometres from the Lahn Valley with its episcopal town, Limburg an der Lahn.

History
In 1343, Daubach had its first documentary mention. Daubach is nowadays a residential community without any established industry. The grocer's shop closed in 2000. The building of the community's own chapel in the 1990s may be described as a highlight.

Politics

Community council
The council is made up of 8 council members who were elected in a majority vote in a municipal election on 7 June 2009.

Coat of arms
The approval for the community to bear its own arms was granted on 14 April 1981 by the government assistant.

References

Further reading
 Hermann-Josef Hucke: Daubach im Wandel der Zeit 1343 - 1993

External links
 Daubach in the collective municipality’s Web pages 

Municipalities in Rhineland-Palatinate
Westerwaldkreis